Wamin is a commune in the department of Pas-de-Calais in the Nord-Pas de Calais region in France of France.

Main sights
The church of Our Lady of Assumption was constructed in 1664 of brick and stone, in typical regional style. The first Lords of Wamin are buried under the choir.

The château was built in the 17th century by François de Fléchin who had inherited, through marriage, the titles of the Créquy family and was elevated to Marquis in 1693. Sold in 1811 by the daughters of the Marquis of Fléchin to the family of Lefebvre de Gouy de Milly.

Population

See also
Communes of the Pas-de-Calais department

References

Communes of Pas-de-Calais
Artois